Zurich 1953 was a chess tournament won by Vasily Smyslov.  It was a Candidates Tournament for the 1954 World Chess Championship, which led to the match between Smyslov and Mikhail Botvinnik. The tournament is famous for the strength of the players, the high quality of the games, and books on the tournament by David Bronstein and Miguel Najdorf that are regarded as among the best tournament books ever written. In May 2022 Yuri Averbakh died at the age of 100, having been the last living player to have played in the tournament.

The tournament was a double Round-robin  event. Players were assigned one point for every win and a half-point for each draw. In later years, Bronstein claimed that the Soviet players were accompanied by KGB agents. According to Bronstein, during the tournament, the KGB handlers started to worry that the American candidate, Samuel Reshevsky, would win, and began pressuring some of the Soviet players to throw their games against Smyslov, who was leading the other Soviet players in points.

{|class="wikitable" style="text-align: center"
! # !! Player !! 1 !! 2 !! 3 !! 4 !! 5 !! 6 !! 7 !! 8 !! 9 !! 10 !! 11 !! 12 !! 13 !! 14 !! 15 !! Total
|-
| 1 || align=left |  ||xx ||½½ ||11 ||½1 ||½½ ||11 ||½½ ||½0 ||½½||½½||½½||½½||1½||11||1½|| 18
|-
| 2 || align=left |  ||½½ ||xx ||1½ ||11 ||½½ ||½0 ||½½ ||½½ ||1½||½½||½½||01||1½||½½||½½|| 16
|-
| 3 || align=left |  ||00||0½||xx ||½½ ||½1 ||½1 ||½½ ||½½ ||½½||0½||11||1½||½1||½½||11|| 16
|-
| 4 || align=left |   ||½0 ||00 ||½½ ||xx ||½½ ||½½ ||½½ ||10||½½||½1||½1||1½||½1||11||1½|| 16
|-
| 5 || align=left |  ||½½ ||½½ ||½0 ||½½ ||xx ||½½ ||0½ ||½½ ||00||½½||½½||11||½1||1½||11|| 15
|-
| 6 || align=left |  ||00||½1||½0||½½ ||½½||xx ||11||½0||01||½½||01||1½||½1||01||½½|| 14½
|-      
| 7 || align=left |   ||½½||½½||½½||½½||1½||00||xx ||1½||1½||½0||½½||½½||½½||0½||11||14½
|-      
| 8 || align=left |  ||½1||½½||½½||01||½½||½1||0½||xx ||10||1½||00||10||1½||0½||01|| 14
|-      
| 9 || align=left |  ||½½||0½||½½||½½||11||10||0½||01||xx ||10||½½||½½||½0||0½||11|| 14
|-     
| 10 || align=left |   ||½½||½½||1½||0½||½½||½½||1½||0½||01 ||xx ||½½ ||½½ ||0½ ||11 ||00|| 13½
|-     
| 11 || align=left |   ||½½||½½||00||½0||½½||10||½½||11||½½ ||½½ ||xx ||½0 ||½½ ||½1 ||½½|| 13½
|-     
| 12 || align=left |   ||½½||10||0½||0½||00||0½||½½||01||½½ ||½½ ||½1 ||xx ||1½ ||½½ ||1½ || 13
|-     
| 13 || align=left |   ||0½||0½||½0||½0||½0||½0||½½||0½||½1 ||1½ ||½½ ||0½ ||xx ||½1 ||11 || 12½
|-     
| 14 || align=left |   ||00||½½||½½||00||0½||10||1½||1½||1½ ||00 ||½0 ||½½ ||½0 ||xx ||1½ || 11½
|-     
| 15 || align=left |   ||0½||½½||00||0½||00||½½||00||10 ||00||11 ||½½ ||0½ ||00 ||0½ ||xx || 8
|}

See also 
Zürich 1934 chess tournament
Zurich Chess Challenge

References

External links

Moves and Annotations for every game played during the tournament.

1953
Chess competitions
1953 in chess
Chess in Switzerland
Sport in Zürich
1953 in Swiss sport
20th century in Zürich